Moatra was a town of ancient Pisidia inhabited during Roman times. 

Its site is located near Bereket, in Asiatic Turkey.

References

Populated places in Pisidia
Former populated places in Turkey
Roman towns and cities in Turkey
History of Burdur Province
Burdur District